Gavlpiggen Peak is a low, isolated peak  southwest of Klakknabben Peak, just north of the Kirwan Escarpment in Queen Maud Land, Antarctica. It was mapped by Norwegian cartographers from surveys and air photos by the Norwegian–British–Swedish Antarctic Expedition (1949–52) and from additional air photos (1958–59), and named Gavlpiggen (the gable peak).

References

Mountains of Queen Maud Land
Princess Martha Coast